Hawthorne is a crater on Mercury. It has a diameter of 120 kilometers. Its name was adopted by the International Astronomical Union in 1979. Hawthorne is named for the American novelist Nathaniel Hawthorne, who lived from 1804 to 1864.

The crater Hals is south of Hawthorne.  To the northeast is Michelangelo, and to the northwest is Shelley.

References

Impact craters on Mercury